Scootering may refer to:

Dog scootering, a sport with dog-powered scooters
Freestyle scootering, an action sport with human-powered scooters
Scootering (British magazine), a motor scooter magazine

See also 
Scooter (disambiguation)